Vladimir Vladimirovich Martynov; or Volodymyr Volodymyrovich Martynov (born 6 April 1976) is a Ukrainian (until 2014), Russian football manager and a former player.

References

External links
 

1976 births
People from Temirtau
Living people
Kazakhstani emigrants to Ukraine
Ukrainian footballers
Association football defenders
Association football forwards
Ukrainian Premier League players
SC Tavriya Simferopol players
FC Desna Chernihiv players
FC Tytan Armyansk players
FC Prykarpattia Ivano-Frankivsk (2004) players
FC Enerhetyk Burshtyn players
FC Nyva Vinnytsia players
FC Metalurh Donetsk players
FC Polissya Zhytomyr players
FC Hoverla Uzhhorod players
FC Zorya Luhansk players
Ukrainian football managers
Russian football managers
Crimean Premier League managers
FC Yevpatoriya managers